EIT may refer to:

Education and research institutes 
 Eastern Institute of Technology, in New Zealand
 Emirates Institute of Technology, now Emirates College of Technology
 Engineering Institute of Technology, in Perth, Australia
 Eritrea Institute of Technology, in Abardae Mai Nefhi, Eritrea
 European Institute of Innovation and Technology, headquartered in Budapest, Hungary

Science 
 Electrical impedance tomography
 Electromagnetically induced transparency
 Extended irreversible thermodynamics
 Extreme ultraviolet Imaging Telescope

Other uses 
 Eitiep language
 Engineer in Training, professional certification level
 Enhanced interrogation techniques
 Everything Is Terrible!, a video blog
 Economies-in-transition, defined by the Kyoto Protocol